The men's 5000 metres walk event  at the 1990 European Athletics Indoor Championships was held in Kelvin Hall on 4 March.

Results

References

maik-richter.de

Racewalking at the European Athletics Indoor Championships
5000